Kutch Lignite Thermal Power Station is Gujarat State Electricity Corporation Limited's only lignite based power plant.

Power Plant
Kachchh Lignite Thermal Power Station is located near Panadhro village in Lakhpat Taluka, Kutch district, Gujarat, India. The plant is adjacent of lignite mines (operated by Gujarat Mineral Development Corporation) and receives lignite direct from the mines.   There are four units presently in operation.

KLTPS Unit-4 has the CFBC boiler which is first time introduced in GSECL.

Installed Capacity

See also 

 Gandhinagar Thermal Power Station
 Ukai Thermal Power Station
 Sikka Thermal Power Station
 Dhuvaran Thermal Power Station
 Wanakbori Thermal Power Station

References 

Coal-fired power stations in Gujarat
Kutch district
1990 establishments in Gujarat
Energy infrastructure completed in 1990
20th-century architecture in India